Rafael Durán may refer to:

 Rafael Durán (actor) (1911–1994), Spanish actor
 Rafael Duran (wrestler) (born 1983), Venezuelan wrestler
 Rafael Durán (footballer) (born 1997), Mexican footballer